Liggett may refer to:

People
Hunter Liggett (1857–1935), American general
Jacob N. Liggett (1829–1912), Virginia politician
Louis K. Liggett (1875–1946), founder of Rexall drug stores
Myron T. Liggett (1930–2017), American folk sculptor
Thomas Milton Liggett (1944–2020), American mathematician 
Phil Liggett (born 1943), English bicycling commentator
Walter Liggett (1886–1935), American journalist

Places
Liggett, Indiana, an unincorporated community in Vigo County
Liggett, Colorado, an unincorporated community in Boulder County
Liggett Lake, a small reservoir in Union County, Ohio
Liggett Lake Dam, the dam that creates the lake

Companies
Liggett Group, tobacco company
Liggett's, company-owned (non-franchised) drugstores of the United Drug Company

Education
University Liggett School